Alwyne is an English given name. Notable people with this name include:

 Alwyne Compton (disambiguation)
 Lord Alwyne Compton (bishop)
 Lord Alwyne Compton (politician)
 Alwyne Wilks
 Alwyne Statham
 John Alwyne Kitching
 Alwyne Jan "AJ" Perez
 Gilbert Byng Alwyne Russell
 Alwyne Michael Webster Whistler

English-language given names